Consort Yi (1392–1421) was an imperial concubine of the Yongle Emperor.  

She was from Korea, and became a member of the imperial harem of the Yongle Emperor in 1409. In 1421, she was one of the many concubines who were accused for having participated in a conspiracy to murder the emperor. She was arrested and interrogated. She was executed for attempted murder of the emperor.

Titles
 During the reign of the Hongwu Emperor (r. 1368–1398):
 Lady Yi (이씨, 李氏) (from 1392)
 During the reign of the Yongle Emperor (r. 1402–1424):
 Gong-nyeo (공녀, 貢女) (from 1409)
 Lady of Bright Deportment (昭儀; from 1409)

References 

1392 births
1421 deaths
Consorts of the Yongle Emperor